Kisjakabfalva is a village in Baranya county, Hungary. Until the end of World War II, the majority of the inhabitants were Danube Swabians, also called locally as Stifolder, because their ancestors once came in the 17th century and 18th century from Fulda (district). Mostly of the former German settlers were expelled to allied-occupied Germany and allied-occupied Austria in 1945–1948, as a result of the Potsdam Agreement.
Only a few Germans of Hungary live there, the majority today are the descendants of Hungarians from the Czechoslovak–Hungarian population exchange. They occupied the houses of the former Danube Swabians inhabitants.

References

External links 
 Street map 

Populated places in Baranya County